El Geteina ( also Al Qutaynah) is a small town located in the state of the White Nile in Sudan. The main languages, spoken in the town, are: Dinka, Nuer, Beja, Nubian and Arabic.
The town is placed just a little bit upstream of the lake formed by the White Nile Dam.

References

Populated places in White Nile (state)